The papal conclave held on 25 and 26 August 1978 was the first of the two held that year. It was convoked to elect a successor to Paul VI, who had died on 6 August 1978. After the cardinal electors assembled in Rome, they elected Cardinal Albino Luciani, Patriarch of Venice, as the new pope on the fourth ballot. He accepted the election and took the name John Paul I.

It was the first conclave since the promulgation of Ingravescentem aetatem (1970), which made cardinals who had reached the age of 80 by the day the conclave began ineligible to participate in the balloting. There were 15 cardinals excluded by that rule. The number of votes cast for Luciani on the final ballot was so great that even the uniform opposition of these cardinals would not have changed the outcome.

Papabili
Among the papabili, or top candidates, were Sergio Pignedoli, President of the Secretariat for Non-Christians, Giuseppe Siri of Genoa, and Corrado Ursi of Naples. Others named Giovanni Benelli of Florence, until recently Vatican Secretary of State, Sebastiano Baggio, Prefect of the Congregation for Bishops, and non-cardinal Anastasio Ballestrero, Archbishop of Turin. The non-Italian most often mentioned was Johannes Willebrands, Archbishop of Utrecht. Aloísio Lorscheider of Brazil, head of the Episcopal Conference of Latin America, favored Albino Luciani, the Patriarch of Venice, while Luciani is believed to have favoured Lorscheider. Time reported that the Dean of the College, Carlo Confalonieri, who was excluded from participating because of age, had been the first to suggest Luciani.

Proceedings and balloting

The conclave was held for two days from 25 August to 26 August 1978 at the Sistine Chapel in the Vatican. Cardinal John Wright, an official of the Roman Curia, was in the U.S. for medical treatments and unable to attend. Proceedings on 25 August 1978 included a Mass celebrated at St. Peter's Basilica by the cardinal electors for divine guidance in their task to elect Pope Paul's successor. The cardinals processed into the Sistine Chapel six hours later while the chapel choir sang the hymn Veni Creator Spiritus. Monsignor Virgilio Noè, the Papal Master of Ceremonies, gave the traditional command of Extra omnes ("Everybody out!"), the doors were locked, and then the actual conclave began, with Cardinal Villot presiding (as would happen again in October) due to being the senior Cardinal bishop in attendance. The chapel windows remained closed, some sealed, and the summer heat was oppressive. Belgian Cardinal Leo Suenens later wrote: "My room was an oven. My cell was a kind of sauna." The conclave of August 1978 was the largest ever assembled. The traditional canopied thrones were replaced with twelve long tables to accommodate the electors. Karol Wojtyła, Aloísio Lorscheider, and Bernardin Gantin reportedly served as scrutineers during the balloting.

Luciani had told his secretary that he would decline the papacy if elected. During the third ballot, Johannes Willebrands and António Ribeiro, who sat on either side of Luciani, whispered words of encouragement to him as he continued to receive more votes. Jaime Sin told Luciani, "You will be the new pope". Luciani was elected on the fourth ballot and when Jean-Marie Villot asked Luciani whether he accepted his election he replied, "May God forgive you for what you have done" and accepted his election. In honor of his two immediate predecessors, he took John Paul as his regnal name. After the election, when Cardinal Sin paid him homage, the new pope noted: "You were a prophet, but my reign will be a short one".

On 26 August 1978 at 6:24 p.m. local time (4:24 p.m. UTC), the first signs of smoke appeared from the chimney of the Sistine Chapel. It was unclear for over an hour whether the smoke was white to indicate a pope had been elected or black to indicate that balloting would continue. Some of the cardinals had personally deposited their notes and tally sheets in the stove, darkening what should have been white smoke. Pericle Felici, as the ranking Cardinal Deacon, then stepped onto the balcony of St. Peter's Basilica and delivered the Habemus Papam in Latin, announcing Luciani's election. At 7:31 p.m. John Paul I appeared on the balcony and gave his blessing. When he appeared about to address the crowd, he was reminded that was not traditional, and he withdrew without speaking further. He invited the cardinal electors to remain in conclave for another night and dined with them, occupying the same chair as he had at their earlier group dinners.

This was the first conclave since 1721 in which three future popes participated–John Paul I, John Paul II, and Benedict XVI–and the first since 1829 in which two did so.

Reported voting tallies

Several authors have provided what they claim to be the vote totals at the conclave. Cardinals were not required to destroy notes they took during the conclave.

Yallop tally
As presented by David Yallop, who claims that John Paul I was murdered.

 First Ballot: Siri 25, Luciani 23, Pignedoli 18, Lorscheider 12, Baggio 9, scattered 24.
 Second Ballot: Siri 35, Luciani 30, Pignedoli 15, Lorscheider 12, scattered 19.
 Third Ballot: Luciani 68, Siri 15, Pignedoli 10, scattered 18.
 Fourth Ballot: Luciani 99, Siri 11, Lorscheider 1 (cast by Luciani).

Burkle-Young tally
As presented by Francis A. Burkle-Young, based on the notes of Cardinal Mario Casariego, Archbishop of Guatemala City.

 First Ballot: Siri 25, Luciani 23, Pignedoli 18, Baggio 9, König 8, Bertoli 5, Pironio 4, Felici 2, Lorscheider 2, and 15 others one each.
 Second Ballot: Luciani 53, Siri 24, Pignedoli 15, Lorscheider, Baggio, Cordeiro, Wojtyła 4 each, Felici 3.
 Third Ballot: Luciani 92, Pignedoli 17, Lorscheider 2.
 Fourth Ballot: Luciani 102, Lorscheider 1 (cast by Luciani), Nemini (no one) 8.

 Thomas-Witts tally
As presented by Gordon Thomas and Max Morgan-Witts.

 First Ballot: same as Burkle-Young's count except 5 votes for Pironio, fourteen candidates with 1.
 Second Ballot: Luciani 46, Pignedoli 19, Lorscheider 14, Baggio 11, Bertoli 4, others unspecified.
 Third Ballot: Luciani 66, Pignedoli 21, Lorscheider 1 (cast by Aramburu), others unspecified.
 Fourth Ballot: Luciani 96, Pignedoli 10, Lorscheider 1 (cast by Aramburu).

According to one report of the balloting, French traditionalist Archbishop Marcel Lefebvre received a small number of votes—variously reported as three or "several"—causing some consternation among the cardinals.

See also
 Cardinal electors for the papal conclaves, August and October 1978

References

External links
 

1978 elections in Europe
1978 in Christianity
1978 in Vatican City
20th-century Catholicism
August 1978 events in Europe
1978 08
Pope John Paul I
Political history of Vatican City